Seppo Kolehmainen (18 January 1933 – 23 February 2009) was a Finnish film actor.

Kolehmainen was born in Pielavesi, Finland. He appeared in Finnish films since late 1955. He appeared in the 1983 James Bond spoof Agent 000 and the Deadly Curves alongside actors Ilmari Saarelainen and Tenho Saurén. More recently, he appeared on Finnish television in two episodes of Salatut elämät in January 2006. He died in Helsinki.

Sources and external links

1933 births
2009 deaths
People from Pielavesi
20th-century Finnish male actors
Finnish male film actors
21st-century Finnish male actors